The enzyme bis(2-ethylhexyl)phthalate esterase (EC 3.1.1.60) catalyzes the reaction 

bis(2-ethylhexyl)phthalate + H2O  2-ethylhexyl phthalate + 2-ethylhexan-1-ol

This enzyme belongs to the family of hydrolases, specifically those acting on carboxylic ester bonds.  The systematic name is bis(2-ethylhexyl)phthalate acylhydrolase. This enzyme is also called DEHP esterase.

References

 

EC 3.1.1
Enzymes of unknown structure